Baron Daresbury, of Walton in the County of Chester, is a title in the Peerage of the United Kingdom. It was created on 21 June 1927 for Sir Gilbert Greenall, 2nd Baronet by King George V. The Baronetcy, of Walton Hall in the County of Chester, was created in the Baronetage of the United Kingdom on 22 February 1876 for his father Gilbert Greenall, who was head of the family brewing business (later Greenall's and now the De Vere Group) and also represented Warrington in the House of Commons as a Conservative.   the titles are held by the first Baron's great-grandson, the fourth Baron, who succeeded his father in 1996.
The former seat of the Greenall family was Walton Hall near Warrington, Cheshire. However, the house was sold in 1941.  The fourth Lord Daresbury was based at Hall Lane Farm on the Daresbury estate, home of the Creamfields music festival.

Greenall baronets, of Walton Hall (1876)
Sir Gilbert Greenall, 1st Baronet (1806–1894)
Sir Gilbert Greenall, 2nd Baronet (1867–1938) (created Baron Daresbury in 1927)

Barons Daresbury (1927)
Gilbert Greenall, 1st Baron Daresbury (1867–1938)
Edward Greenall, 2nd Baron Daresbury (1902–1990)
Edward Gilbert Greenall, 3rd Baron Daresbury (1928–1996)
Peter Gilbert Greenall, 4th Baron Daresbury (b. 1953)

The heir apparent is the present holder's son the Hon. Thomas Edward Greenall (b. 1984)

Arms

References

Kidd, Charles, Williamson, David (editors). Debrett's Peerage and Baronetage (1990 edition). New York: St Martin's Press, 1990.

Article on Walton Hall and the Greenall family

Baronies in the Peerage of the United Kingdom
Noble titles created in 1927